The Philippines women's national under-18 volleyball team represents the Philippines in women's under-18 volleyball events. It is controlled and managed by the Philippine National Volleyball Federation (PNVF) that is a member of Asian volleyball body Asian Volleyball Confederation (AVC) and the international volleyball body government the Fédération Internationale de Volleyball (FIVB).

Rankings 
This is the current ranking of the volleyball team under-18 volleyball team of the Philippines in FIVB World Rankings.

Current roster

The following persons were assigned by the Philippine National Volleyball Federation as part of the coaching staff.

Rotation
The following is the rotation of the starting roster of the women's national u18 team.

Previous Squad
Roster:
  Ezra Gyra Barroga 
  Rica Diolan
  Justine Dorog
  Christine Dianne Francisco
  Ejiya Laure
  Maristela Genn Layug
  Kristine Magallanes
  Nicole Anne Magsarile 
  Maria Lina Isabel Molde
  Jasmine Nabor
  Faith Janine Shirley Nisperos
  Roselyn Rosier
  Alyssa Marie Teope
  Caitlin Viray
 Head coach:  Jerry Yee 
 Team Manager:  Mariano See T. Diet

Competition history

Youth Olympic Games

World Championship

Asian Youth Volleyball Championship

References

External links
Official fanpage

volleyball
Women's volleyball in the Philippines
National women's under-18 volleyball teams